Sedgley Woods is a section of east Fairmount Park, Philadelphia, Pennsylvania, and a historical disc golf course site. The site was established in 1977. It has one of the oldest permanent pole-hole disc golf courses. Friends of Sedgley Woods, a volunteer organisation, maintains the grounds, runs monthly tournaments, community out reach programs, and occasional events in conjunction with the Mid-Atlantic Disc Club and the Professional Disc Golf Association.

The area was the country estate of Joshua Fisher (1707-1783), a wealthy Quaker merchant from Lewes, Delaware, who purchased the 40-acre property in 1753 and constructed a colonial mansion there known as “The Cliffs”. The mansion was destroyed by fire in 1986 after decades of not being maintained.

More than 130 species of birds have been documented at Sedgley Woods and breeding birds have been monitored at the site since 2016.

Disc Golf History

In 1976, after graduating from Penn State, Jim Powers, along with Joe D'Annunzio and Rick Vlam, founded the Philadelphia Frisbee Club. Jim played Ultimate Frisbee in college, starting the Penn State Ultimate Team in 1974. Once back in the Philadelphia area he formed the new club by word of mouth and contacting local Frisbee Masters Joe D'Annunzio and Rick Vlam. The members were interested in all flying disc games including Ultimate, disc golf, freestyle, Double Disc Court and the field events of distance and self-caught-flight (maximum time aloft, MTA; throw run and catch, TRC). The club began meeting and playing weekly at several areas around the city, most notably in Valley Forge National Park outside of the city and within Fairmount Park in Philadelphia.

Even though the club was dedicated to all Frisbee sports, Ultimate and disc golf quickly became the favorites among the PFC members. Wherever the members met for informal “pick-up” Ultimate they designed golf holes with natural tree targets or available manmade targets such as lampposts. Club members began to dream of a permanent Frisbee golf course for more structured play including tournaments.

While Jim was establishing the PFC, "Steady Ed" Headrick and his son Ken were developing the Pole Hole, a disc golf target capable of catching and retaining a Frisbee. Steady Ed had just left Wham-O to set up his own company, the Disc Golf Association (DGA) and to found the Professional Disc Golf Association (PDGA). Steady Ed, like members of the PFC in Philadelphia, especially enjoyed the game of Frisbee golf. He and Ken believed that what the sport needed most was a standardized target. After testing numerous prototype baskets Steady Ed hit upon the idea of using suspended chains to arrest the forward motion of a disc and thereby allowing it to drop into a basket. Production of the first baskets followed after he and Ken patented their final design, later to be known as the Mach 1. They installed the first (and oldest permanent) Pole Hole course in Oak Grove Park in Pasadena, California, in 1976.

Wham-O brought Steady Ed and Jim together and that brought Pole Hole baskets to Sedgley Woods. Frisbee manufacturer Wham-O set up and funded the International Frisbee Association (IFA) in order to promote organized Frisbee play. To do this the IFA established Regional Directors, a group of dedicated Frisbee people, one from each of 12 regions across the country. The Regional Directors communicated with clubs and players, organized tournaments, sanctioned events and records, distributed rulebooks and many other similar activities. As Jim had just established a robust Frisbee club in a major metropolitan area he was appointed as the Regional Director of the Northeast region. He and the other Regional Directors were invited to participate in the IFA's "Invitational World Frisbee Championships" held at the Rose Bowl, in Pasadena, California. There Jim met Ed Headrick and Wham-O officials who indicated that they were interested in establishing the first Pole Hole disc golf course on the East Coast. Jim invited Ed and Wham-O reps to attend the first major PFC tournament, to be held on Belmont Plateau in Fairmount Park, Philadelphia.

Early in 1977 the Philadelphia Frisbee Club hosted the multi-event "Philadelphia Frisbee Championships." The site for the competition was Belmont Plateau, a particularly beautiful section of Fairmount Park that overlooks the skyline of Philadelphia. The tournament was well attended, both with competitors and spectators. The disc golf portion of the tournament was played on a temporary "object course" where trees were used as the targets. Steady Ed and Wham-O representatives were so impressed with the club and Fairmount Park that they offered to donate 18 baskets and tee signs if the club would handle the installation. Jim contacted the Fairmount Park Commission and explained the offer. The commission responded favorably and after three meetings between the commission and the club, a site was chosen in West Fairmount Park.

This site, the first, was near the site of the tournament, just off Belmont Avenue. Here the club members met and began to layout 18 holes through the densely wooded area. After 4 weeks of work clearing our fairways through the trees, the park commission directed the club to another site, this time in East Fairmount Park. The name of the second site: Sedgley Woods.

The reason for the change is not documented. Perhaps the park commissioners wanted to bring this new activity to the largely unused East Park, particularly close to one of the most depressed areas of the city thinking that a new sports activity would help stabilize that portion of the park and the city. The first site lacked off street parking and some club members had hoped for a better site with the possibility for more amenities. The club redirected their efforts to the new site.

When club members visited the Sedgley site, they found a landscape that varied from small open areas to dense woods, with a predominance of lightly wooded land and gentle slopes. The area that became the front nine features many small leafed locust trees and several huge oak and maple specimens. The trees in this area allow just enough sun in for grass to grow below these trees. The area of the back nine is more densely wooded. Two ravines cut through the area with dry streambeds. The site is bounded by Reservoir Drive, a park road, on the North; the Smith Memorial Play Ground on the West; a ball golf driving range on the East; and a densely wooded unused area of the park to the South. The area takes its name from the Sedgley Estate, one of many private holdings along the Schuylkill River that were purchased to create Fairmount Park in the 19th century. The Sedgley Mansion was located on the south side of Girard Avenue, to the south of the course. Today only a gatehouse remains from the Sedgley Estate. Fairmount Park currently uses it as office space. Well beyond hole 12 and overlooking the river are the remains of The Cliffs, one of many "country" houses from the 18th century that dot Fairmount Park.

At the new site the club leaders, including John Schalberg, Max Smith, Rick Vlam, Joe D'Annunzio and Jim, set about creating a course with the same enthusiasm they had shown at the first site. Ed Headrick visited the site several times and provided the initial design. The layout, at 4,016 feet, utilized the existing landscape features to the best advantage. Holes were designed with narrow fairways through the tightly treed areas, and up, down and across the modest hills. No major trees had to come down to create the layout. Sedgley fit Ed's vision of how a disc golf course should be designed: a predominance of short holes each requiring a great variety of shots. Each hole was designed to be unique, both in length and the type and variety of hazards. Several holes were designed with both left and right curve fairways while some holes mandated roller tee shots because of the low hanging trees very close to the tee. The woods at Sedgley and the areas of underbrush that line many holes are still challenging to disc golfers. Even though every hole can be birdied, scores of 4, 5 or more can be carded on every hole as well. The course is still a challenge and delight to play today. This reinforces the assertion that this early course is a masterpiece of disc golf course design.

Sedgley was played as an object course for almost a year. Club members marked the original tees with signs made of upright 2x4's with the hole number and layout carved into its surface. The original targets were trees. In the summer of 1978 the Pole Hole baskets and tee signs arrived from DGA. The club members and Fairmount Park staff installed them creating what is claimed to be the first permanent Pole Hole disc golf course on the East Coast, although Leonard Park in Mt. Kisco, NY and several ski hills in New England had Pole Hole baskets installed in 1977. It is probably one of the first 50 in the world overall and likely one of the first dozen to exist continuously.

Ed Headrick kept no official record of the original order of the first Pole Hole courses. Part of the confusion in the record keeping stems from the fact that many disc golf courses existed with object targets, some for years, before baskets were installed. Other early courses were not permanent.

Late in the Fall of 1978 two of the holes were lengthened. The club members decided that holes 2 and 12 should be more challenging and moved the baskets to permanent extended positions. Once the basket positions were fixed the club members appointed a course pro, Max Smith, and began to have tournaments at Sedgley.

With the baskets and tee signs in place Sedgley Woods was the site of numerous important Frisbee tournaments. The PFC, by virtue of strong club support and the Pole Hole baskets, bid for and won the right to host national golf events sanctioned by the IFA. These golf tournaments were part of the National Series Tournaments that ran from 1976 to 1982 and acted as qualifiers for the Invitational World Frisbee Championships. In addition to the NS meets, OCTAD, a multi-event competition that started in New Jersey, came under the auspices of the PFC and was held at Sedgley for several years. The golf portion of these tournaments took place in Sedgley proper and the other events were held on the large ball-golf driving range next to the course and on the large field north of Reservoir Drive. These tournaments attracted the top players from across the country, over 300 at one event. Players' packages for the competitors included everything from custom printed discs and shirts to visors and hats. Various Philadelphia rock stations including WMMR, WYSP and WIOQ sponsored these major tournaments which drew many spectators and live FM radio media attention.

In the Fall of 1984 Darby Williammee, Jim Powers and Dave Stembel created a new PDGA tournament course by designing a new set of tees. These tees are now the "yellow" tees. This was done in response to Innova's original Aero and Discraft's original Phantom discs which had allowed the average winning rounds to drop from 4 or 5 under to 10 or better. The course measures 4,754 feet from the yellow tees. The yellow tee layout quickly became the favorite course for the pros, though the blue tees are still played to this day in various competitive formats including best-disc doubles and the Sedgley Tag Challenge.

Friends of Sedgley Woods

The Friends of Sedgley Woods is an organization dedicated to the preservation of Sedgley Woods Disc Golf Course and the development of the sport of Disc Golf in Philadelphia, Pennsylvania. This club was formed in 1990 after ten of the original Sedgley baskets were stolen. The first act of the Friends group was to raise money and replace all of the baskets with Mach 3 Pole Holes. The remaining "old" baskets were donated to other clubs to "seed" new courses. Sedgley now has three tee placements for each basket, the blue "original 1977 tees", yellow "1984" tees and red "1991" tees (4,691 feet), however all of the baskets remain in their 1978 locations.

Since 1978, the Philadelphia Frisbee Club has evolved into several organizations devoted to disc sports. Many of the original club members have moved on to start new clubs and design new disc golf courses. There are now separate disc golf clubs in New Jersey, Delaware, and in Bucks and Chester Counties in Pennsylvania and Pole Hole courses have spread throughout the east coast states. Along the way the PFC became the PAFC, adding "Area" to its name. Later it became the Tri-State Frisbee Club when a strong contingent of Delaware and New Jersey golfers developed. The Tri-State club begat the Mid-Atlantic Disc Club (MADC) which now runs a golf series enjoyed by thousands and has provided some of the largest purses in professional disc golf. The Ultimate players split off and formed their own club called The Philadelphia Area Disc Alliance (PADA). In addition to fostering men's and women's tournament teams, PADA now runs a summer league serving over 800 people per year.

Sedgley Woods Official Course Pros

Max Smith: 1977-1978
Rick Vlam: 1978-1981
Darby Williammee: 1981-1989
Barry Noakes: 1989-2015
David Woods: 2016
Alex Caldwell: 2017–Present

References

External links
 
 Visit Philly: Sedgley Woods

East Fairmount Park
1977 establishments in Pennsylvania
Northwest Philadelphia